Billy Rogers (born 16 July 1949) is an Australian former soccer player who played as a midfielder.

Club career
After playing junior football for Sunshine City in Victoria, Rogers moved to New South Wales to play for APIA. After severals season with the NSW State League club he joined South Melbourne for the first National Soccer League season in 1977.

International career
Born in South Africa, Rogers played four times for the Australia national team, including two full international matches against New Zealand in 1981.

References

1949 births
Living people
South African emigrants to Australia
Australian soccer players
Association football midfielders
Australia international soccer players
National Soccer League (Australia) players